Nephelomyias is a genus of birds in the tyrant flycatcher family Tyrannidae. 
It contains the following three species:

References

 
Bird genera